Tolypanthus lagenifer, the Indian tolypanthus, is a parasitic shrub, native to southwest India in Matheran, Maharashtra. It is hosted on the tree Xantolis tomentosa, and flowers between July and September.

References

Loranthaceae